I'd Do Anything may refer to:
I'd Do Anything (2004 TV series), a 2004 American reality series that aired on ESPN
I'd Do Anything (2008 TV series), a 2008 talent show-themed television series that aired on the BBC
"I'd Do Anything" (Oliver! song), from the musical Oliver!
"I'd Do Anything" (Simple Plan song)
"I'd Do Anything" (Dead or Alive song)